Mostafa Hajati (born 22 June 1983) is an Iranian professional football player who currently plays for Damash Gilan in the Azadegan League.

Hajati has spent the majority of his career at Damash. In 2014, after six seasons with Damash, he joined Sepidrood in 2nd Division where he spent one season until rejoining his former club S.C. Damash.

Club statistics

1 includes seven matches in 2014–15 Iran Football 2nd Division Second Round.

External links
Mostafa Hajati at PersianLeague.com
Iran Pro League Stats

Living people
People from Rasht
Iranian footballers
Pegah Gilan players
Damash Gilan players
Sepidrood Rasht players
1983 births
Association football midfielders
Sportspeople from Gilan province